Second Lieutenant Patrick Anthony Langan Byrne  (1895 – 16 October 1916) was an Irish flying ace of the First World War credited with ten aerial victories.

Early life and education
Byrne was born in Clogherhead, Co. Louth, the son of Dr. and Mrs. J. V. Byrne. He was educated at Clongowes.

World War I

Langan-Byrne was commissioned as a temporary second lieutenant in the Royal Field Artillery on 9 October 1914, serving in 129th Battery, 30th Brigade. He was later seconded to the Royal Flying Corps, in which he was appointed a flying officer on 4 August 1916.

Langan-Byrne began his victories on 31 August 1916, when he used Airco DH.2 No. 6011 to force an enemy aircraft to land. Three days later, he drove a German fighter aircraft down out of control for his second win. On 15 September, he switched to DH.2 No. 7911 and shot down another German fighter in flames. The next day, Byrne destroyed a Fokker D.II. Then, between 21 and 28 September, he ran off a string of five "forced to land" victories. His being shot down by four Germans on 23 September did not seem to daunt him.

He was appointed a flight commander with the temporary rank of captain on 14 October just prior to his last victory on the morning of 16 October. That afternoon he was airborne for his second sortie of the day. He led "B" Flight right for Oswald Boelcke, commander of Jasta 2, who promptly killed him for the German ace's 34th victory. Langan-Byrne's grave site is unknown, though it is known he was buried. His Officer Commanding, Major Lanoe Hawker, lamented, "He was such a nice lad, as well as the best officer I have ever met." As a flying casualty of the Western Front with no known grave he is commemorated at the Arras Flying Services Memorial.

Having scored all of his 10 victories in the Airco DH.2, he's the most successful pilot in the type.

List of aerial victories

Honours and awards
Distinguished Service Order 
Second Lieutenant Patrick Anthony Langan-Byrne, Royal Artillery and Royal Flying Corps.
"For conspicuous skill and gallantry. He has shown great pluck in attacking hostile machines, often against large odds. He has accounted for several. On one occasion, with two other machines, he attacked seventeen enemy machines, shot down one in flames and forced another to land."

References
Notes

Bibliography
 
 

1895 births
1916 deaths
People from County Louth
People educated at Clongowes Wood College
Royal Field Artillery officers
Royal Flying Corps officers
Irish World War I flying aces
Companions of the Distinguished Service Order
British military personnel killed in World War I
Aviators killed by being shot down